is a former Japanese football player.

Playing career
Kawasaki was born in Osaka on December 18, 1982. He joined J1 League club Cerezo Osaka in 2001. However he could not play at all in the match. In September 2002, he moved to Japan Football League (JFL) club Sagawa Express Osaka and played several matches. In 2003, he moved to J2 League club Montedio Yamagata. He played many matches as substitute player in 2003. However his opportunity to play decreased from 2004. In 2006, he moved to J2club Consadole Sapporo. However he could hardly play in the match in 2 seasons. In 2008, he moved to JFL club Kataller Toyama. Although he could not become a regular player for injury, he played many matches and Kataller was promoted to J2 end of 2008 season. He became a regular player in June 2009 and played many matches until end of 2009 season. However his opportunity to play decreased in 2010 and he retired end of 2010 season.

Club statistics

References

External links

1982 births
Living people
Association football people from Osaka Prefecture
Sportspeople from Osaka
Japanese footballers
J1 League players
J2 League players
Japan Football League players
Cerezo Osaka players
Sagawa Shiga FC players
Montedio Yamagata players
Hokkaido Consadole Sapporo players
Kataller Toyama players
Association football midfielders